Antonio Busini (5 July 1904 – 20 August 1975) was an Italian professional football player, coach, and official, who played as a midfielder.

Club career
Busini played for 8 seasons (196 games, 31 goals) in the Serie A for Bologna F.C. 1909, ACF Fiorentina, Calcio Padova and Sampierdarenese.

International career
Busini played his only game for the Italy national football team on 28 April 1929 in a match against Germany.

Personal life
His two older brothers (including the oldest Federico Busini) played football professionally. To distinguish them, Federico was referred to as Busini I and Antonio as Busini III.

Honours

As a player
Bologna
 Serie A champion: 1928–29.

As a technical director
Milan
 Serie A champion: 1950–51.
 Latin Cup winner: 1951.

External links
 
 

1904 births
1975 deaths
Italian footballers
Calcio Padova players
Bologna F.C. 1909 players
ACF Fiorentina players
U.C. Sampdoria players
Italy international footballers
Serie A players
Italian football managers
Serie A managers
A.C. Milan managers
Genoa C.F.C. managers
U.S. 1913 Seregno Calcio players
Association football midfielders